Bäckaskog Castle in Kristianstad Municipality, Scania, southern Sweden, was originally a monastery built in the 13th century. It was transformed into a castle in the 16th century. The castle is located on the isthmus between Ivö Lake (Scania's largest lake) and Oppmanna Lake.

The monastery was closed down by the Danish Crown in 1537 during the Reformation. In 1584–1653, the noblemen Henrik Ramel and his son Henrik Ramel Junior gave the castle its present appearance.

References

Bäckaskog Castle - Official site.

Castles in Skåne County
Tourist attractions in Skåne County
Medieval Denmark